Romane Denis is a Canadian actress. She is most noted for her performance in the film Slut in a Good Way (Charlotte a du fun), for which she received a Prix Iris nomination for Revelation of the Year at the 20th Quebec Cinema Awards, and a Canadian Screen Award nomination for Best Supporting Actress at the 7th Canadian Screen Awards in 2019.

She voiced Nikki Gold in the video game Marvel's Guardians of the Galaxy.

Filmography

Film

Television

Video games

References

External links

1998 births
Canadian television actresses
Canadian film actresses
Canadian voice actresses
Canadian video game actresses
Actresses from Quebec
French Quebecers
Living people
Canadian child actresses